The Arch is a 1968 Hong Kong drama film directed by Tang Shu Shuen. The film was selected as the Hong Kong entry for the Best Foreign Language Film at the 42nd Academy Awards, but was not accepted as a nominee.

Cast
 Lisa Lu as Madame Tung
 Roy Chiao as Captain Yang
 Szu-yun Chen
 Yu-Kuan Chen
 Hilda Chow Hsuan as Wei-Ling
 Po Hu
 Ying Lee as Chang
 Yui Liang as Monk
 Tang Shu Shuen

Reception
Variety reviewed the film at the San Francisco Film Festival's "New Director Series" on 31 October 1968, describing the film as ""a sensitively photographed, professionally-made story," and praising Subrata Mitra (also Satyajit Ray's cinematographer) as "exceptional."

See also
 List of submissions to the 42nd Academy Awards for Best Foreign Language Film
 List of Hong Kong submissions for the Academy Award for Best Foreign Language Film

References

External links
 

1968 films
1968 drama films
1960s Mandarin-language films
Hong Kong black-and-white films
Films directed by Tang Shu Shuen
Hong Kong drama films